The Stuewe House at 617 Nebraska in Alma, Kansas was built in 1873.  Also known as the Stuewe Brothers Creamery, it was listed on the National Register of Historic Places in 2007.

It is a -story wood-and-limestone house, built in 1873 and expanded in 1885 and in 1893.

References

Houses on the National Register of Historic Places in Kansas
Houses completed in 1873
Wabaunsee County, Kansas